Casimiro António Serra Afonso, Zé Cabra, (born 25 June 1965, in Gralhós, Macedo de Cavaleiros), former painter and comedy-singer from Portugal. He lives in France.

He was known for his shows in the most hidden villages of Portugal. Zé Cabra's acting gained him some popularity for a short time, when he recorded his first songs and appeared in a couple of TV shows. He was also known for his bad singing so he was never taken seriously. Zé Cabra has admitted that he can't sing.

References

20th-century Portuguese male singers
1969 births
Living people
People from Sintra